Havi Schanz also known as Havi Art, was born in Argentina in Santa Fe City. He has been living in Miami Beach since 2005. 
He draws upon rich impressionistic, romantic, and baroque influences to create a unique representation of pop culture iconography. His vision of art is reflected in a poetic way as his brushstrokes capture people's feelings and emotions. In the difficult-to-accomplish simplicity of his paintings, he skillfully combines rigid and structured forms without losing the organic character of his art.

"I paint souls!" (Havi Schanz, 2013) 

Havi Schanz has almost 30 years of combined experience as an artist, architect, and interior and graphic designer. He has held several positions as an Architect, including among others, Sauce Viejo’ Commissioner of Architecture, and Professor at the Universidad Nacional del Litoral in Argentina. He received an Architectural degree, and a Master in Color, Audio-Visual Media, and Conceptual Art from the Universidad Nacional del Litoral, Argentina. He has also studied photography, digital video, acting, costume, and set design.
 
Havi Schanz's art has been widely exhibited in several solo and group exhibitions in Argentina, Panama, Venezuela, Colombia, United Kingdom, Italy, France, Spain, Czech Republic, Germany, Greece, Australia, New Zealand, Mexico and the United States. In Miami his work was exhibited in Aldo Castillos Gallery, ArtSpot Miami, Art Basel 2014

Works
Divas & Divos by Havi Schanz (2013–2014)
Havi Schanz celebrates the Golden Age of cinema with striking portraits of some of the most recognizable and storied faces in film. Schanz's "Divas" series immortalizes female sensuality and beauty, "Divos" pays tribute to the divine masculine. Capturing the soul of the subject, the artist's portraits communicate the most private of thoughts with us through their uncannily expressive gaze.
Schanz primarily works in acrylic with a palette knife on canvas.
Divas Collection by Havi Schanz: Grace Kelly, Sophia Loren, Donna Summer, Marilyn Monroe, María Félix, Ava Gardner, Elizabeth Taylor, Audrey Hepburn and Frida Kahlo.
Divos Collection by Havi Schanz: Robert Redford, Paul Newman, Cary Grant, Marlon Brando, Rock Hudson, Clark Gable, Steve McQueen, James Dean and Montgomery Clift.

Robin Williams inmotalized in Ocean Drive
Schanz painted a portrait of Robin Williams as his The Birdcage character that now adorns the Carlyle 's Hotel front porch.

Over his career he has shown he is philanthropic by nature, Havi Schanz has donated many of his paintings to benefit noteworthy charitable organizations like Children's Autism Foundation, Human Rights Campaign, Lions Club International, Make-A-Wish Foundation, and Unicorn Children's Foundation, aidscareos.com, among others, but also sold a portrait of Donald Trump to the Trump Foundation.

He has collaborated with Gloria Estefan and her husband, Emilio Estefan, to create a portrait that was auctioned to benefit the non-profit group Equality. Also, Toby Keith, Cindy Crawford, and David Cook  signed their portraits for auction.

Further reading
Inside Havi's Soul, interview by Rafa Carvajal Wire Magazine

References

Argentine artists
Living people
Year of birth missing (living people)